Saisiyat (sometimes spelled Saisiat) is the language of the Saisiyat, a Taiwanese indigenous people. It is a Formosan language of the Austronesian family. It has approximately 4,750 speakers.

Distribution
The language area of Saisiyat is small, situated in the northwest of the country between the Hakka Chinese and Atayal regions in the mountains (Wufeng, Hsinchu; Nanchuang and Shitan, Miaoli).
 
There are two main dialects: Ta'ai (North Saisiyat) and Tungho (South Saisiyat). Ta'ai is spoken in Hsinchu and Tungho is spoken in Miao-Li.
 
Kulon, an extinct Formosan language, is closely related to Saisiyat but is considered by Taiwanese linguist Paul Jen-kuei Li to be a separate language.

Usage
Today, one thousand Saisiyat people do not use the Saisiyat language. Many young people use Hakka or Atayal instead, and few children speak Saisiyat. Hakka Chinese speakers, Atayal speakers and Saisiyat speakers live more or less together. Many Saisiyat are able to speak Saisiyat, Hakka, Atayal, Mandarin, and, sometimes, Min Nan as well. Although Saisiyat has a relatively large number of speakers, the language is endangered.

Orthography

 a - [ä]
 ae - [æ]
 b - [β]
 e - [ə]
 ng - [ŋ]
 oe - [œ]
 s - [s/θ]
 S - [ʃ]
 y - [j]
 z - [z/ð]
 ' - [ʔ]

 aa/aː - [aː]
 ee/eː - [əː]
 ii/iː - [iː]

Phonology

Consonants

Orthographic notes:
 is a retroflex lateral approximant, while  is a palato-alveolar fricative.

Vowels

Grammar

Syntax
Although it also allows for verb-initial constructions, Saisiyat is a strongly subject-initial language (i.e., SVO), and is shifting to an accusative language, while it still has many features of split ergativity (Hsieh & Huang 2006:91). Pazeh and Thao, also Northern Formosan languages, are the only other Formosan languages that allow for SVO constructions.
 
Saisiyat's case-marking system distinguishes between personal and common nouns (Hsieh & Huang 2006:93).

Pronouns
Saisiyat has an elaborate pronominal system (Hsieh & Huang 2006:93).

Verbs
The following  are verbal prefixes in Saisiyat (Hsieh & Huang 2006:93).
 

 
Saisiyat verbs can be nominalized in the following ways.

References

Citations

Works cited

Further reading

External links
 Yuánzhùmínzú yǔyán xiànshàng cídiǎn 原住民族語言線上詞典  – Saisiyat search page at the "Aboriginal language online dictionary" website of the Indigenous Languages Research and Development Foundation
 Saisiyat teaching and leaning materials published by the Council of Indigenous Peoples of Taiwan 
 Saisiyat translation of President Tsai Ing-wen's 2016 apology to indigenous people – published on the website of the presidential office

Formosan languages
Languages of Taiwan
Endangered Austronesian languages
Saisiyat people